Wirth Middleton Munroe (November 29, 1902 – October 21, 1968) was a North American yacht designer and son of Ralph Middleton Munroe.

Munroe was born at the Barnacle, now the Barnacle Historic State Park.  In 1933 he married Mary Kimball Poore of Coral Gables and they had two children (William Middleton Munroe and Charles Poore Munroe). He was Commodore of the Biscayne Bay Yacht Club 1946–1947, a member of the North American Yacht Racing Union (NAYRU) 1936–1966, and the Cruising Club of America as well as Vice-Commodore of the Miami Proa Club. He was a member of the Board of Directors of the Historical Association of Southern Florida (HASF) 1943–1966, and served as President of HASF in 1945.

Boat Designing

Wirth Munroe began designing boats at an early age. Some of his designs, for example the Sea Sailer class were put into mass production. Below is a list of some of the many boats he designed with the earliest known boat name and earliest known owner indicated.

Production boats
Arco 33
Columbia 33 Caribbean
Columbia 34

Sea Sailer 30' Boats

OffShore 30 Boats

Other Boats Designed by Wirth Munroe

The Barnacle Historic State Park

References
Data in charts is derived from Lloyd's Register of American Yachts. All other data is derived from interviews with his children, and his father's biography, The Commodore's Story.

1902 births
1968 deaths
American yacht designers
20th-century American architects